Leandro Javier Díaz Borzani (born 26 June 1986) is a retired Argentine footballer who played as a midfielder.

Club career
Díaz played for the youth teams of Boca Juniors from 2004 and in 2005 he spent time in Spain with Ciudad de Murcia and Villarreal. He returned to Boca Juniors in 2006.

In 2007, he joined Huracán on a one-year loan. At the beginning of the 2008-09 season his loan was renewed. On October 5, 2008, he scored a bicycle kick to give Huracán a victory over Independiente.

Coaching career
In March 2020, Díaz was appointed assistant coach of newly appointed Colón manager Eduardo Domínguez. Domínguez and his staff, including Díaz, left Colón at the end of 2021. In January 2022, he once again became the assistant of Eduardo Domínguez, this time at Independiente.

Honours

Club
Boca Juniors
 Argentine Primera División (1): 2006 Clausura
 Recopa Sudamericana (1): 2006
 Copa Libertadores (1): 2007

Universidad Católica
 Primera División de Chile (1): 2010

References

External links
 Díaz at Football Lineups
 Argentine Primera statistics at Fútbol XXI  
 

1986 births
Living people
Footballers from Buenos Aires
Argentine footballers
Argentine expatriate footballers
Association football midfielders
Boca Juniors footballers
Club Atlético Huracán footballers
Club Deportivo Universidad Católica footballers
Once Caldas footballers
Argentine Primera División players
Chilean Primera División players
Categoría Primera A players
CSyD Tristán Suárez footballers
Argentine expatriate sportspeople in Chile
Argentine expatriate sportspeople in Colombia
Expatriate footballers in Chile
Expatriate footballers in Colombia